Isaiah Wilkins (born September 23, 1995) is an American professional basketball player and coach, currently a graduate assistant for the University of Virginia men’s basketball team.

College career
In college, Wilkins made the ACC All-Defensive Team in 2017 and 2018, and was named that conference's Defensive Player of the Year in 2018. As a senior in 2017–18, Wilkins averaged 6.0 points, 6.2 rebounds, 1.6 assists, 1.2 steals and 1.4 blocks per game.

Professional career

Greensboro Swarm (2018–2019)
After going undrafted in the 2018 NBA draft, Wilkins joined the Houston Rockets for the 2018 NBA Summer League, but was removed without reason. On July 26, 2018, Wilkins joined the Charlotte Hornets on a training camp deal. He was waived by the Hornets on October 11. He subsequently was added to the roster of the Hornets’ NBA G League affiliate, the Greensboro Swarm.

Canterbury Rams (2019)
On March 20, 2019, Wilkins signed with the Canterbury Rams for the 2019 New Zealand NBL season. He was named the NBL Defensive Player of the Year.

Polpharma Starogard Gdański (2019–2020)
On August 17, 2019, Wilkins signed with Polpharma Starogard Gdański of the Polish Basketball League.

ratiopharm Ulm (2020–2021)
On July 31, 2020, he has signed with ratiopharm Ulm of the German Basketball Bundesliga. Wilkins would play for ratiopharm Ulm for 11 months before returning to UVA as a coach, putting a finish to his playing career.

Coaching career

Virginia (2021–present)
On June 15, 2021, Wilkins announced that he would be returning to UVA as a graduate assistant while he will be pursuing a master’s degree in UVA’s School of Education and Human Development.

Career statistics

College

|-
| style="text-align:left;"| 2014–15
| style="text-align:left;"| Virginia
| 28 || 0 || 9.4 || .396 || .667 || .545 || 2.5 || .4 || .2 || .6 || 1.6
|-
| style="text-align:left;"| 2015–16
| style="text-align:left;"| Virginia
| 37 || 21 || 21.4 || .518 || .000 || .583 || 4.1 || 1.5 || .8 || .8 || 4.6
|-
| style="text-align:left;"| 2016–17
| style="text-align:left;"| Virginia
| 33 || 28 || 26.5 || .556 || .571 || .702 || 6.0 || 1.1 || 1.0 || 1.3 || 6.8
|-
| style="text-align:left;"| 2017–18
| style="text-align:left;"| Virginia
| 34 || 34 || 27.5 || .485 || .176 || .756 || 6.2 || 1.6 || 1.2 || 1.4 || 6.0
|- class="sortbottom"
| style="text-align:center;" colspan="2"| Career
| 132 || 83 || 21.7 || .508 || .300 || .671 || 4.8 || 1.2 || .8 || 1.1 || 4.9

Personal life
Wilkins is the stepson of Naismith Basketball Hall of Fame inductee Dominique Wilkins.

References

External links
 Virginia Cavaliers bio
 ESPN profile
 "Kiwi Jack Salt helped Virginia basketballer Isaiah Wilkins through darkest days" at stuff.co.nz

1995 births
Living people
American expatriate basketball people in New Zealand
American expatriate basketball people in Poland
American men's basketball players
Basketball players from Georgia (U.S. state)
Canterbury Rams players
Forwards (basketball)
Greensboro Swarm players
People from Lilburn, Georgia
ratiopharm Ulm players
Sportspeople from the Atlanta metropolitan area
Virginia Cavaliers men's basketball players